Ariel Behar and Gonzalo Escobar defeated Nikola Mektić and Mate Pavić in the final, 6–2, 3–6, [10–7], to win the doubles title at the 2022 Serbia Open. The unseeded duo earned their third career ATP Tour doubles title together.

Ivan and Matej Sabanov were the defending champions, but they lost in the quarterfinals to Mektić and Pavić.

Seeds

Draw

Draw

References

External links
Main draw

Serbia Open - Doubles
2022 Doubles